Königstein station or Königstein railway station may refer to

 Königstein (Sächsische Schweiz) station, on the Dresden S-Bahn in Saxony, Germany
 Königstein (Taunus) station, on the Königstein Railway in Hesse, Germany